Eastleigh Football Club is a professional association football club based in Eastleigh, Hampshire, England.

History

Formation to Wessex League (1946–1986)
The club was formed on 22 May 1946 by Derik Brooks and a group of friends in the Fleming Arms public house in Swaythling, Southampton and originally known as Swaythling Athletic, which then changed to Swaythling. The club began playing home matches firstly on Southampton Common and then at 'Westfield' in Swaythling. In 1950 they joined the Hampshire League. In keeping with their early progress, the club moved to a new ground at Ten Acres in 1957 – which remains their home to this day. In 1980 the club were renamed Eastleigh. Eastleigh were consistently one of the stronger teams in the top tier of the Hampshire League, Division One, in the early 1980s and they achieved their highest final position of 4th (three times: in 1982, 1984 and 1985.) Their first match in the FA Cup was a 2–1 success against Southern League side Poole Town in 1981. They went on to beat Melksham Town in the next round before succumbing 2–4 to another Southern League side, Dorchester Town.

Wessex League (1986–2002)
In 1986 Eastleigh F.C. were accepted as one of the founding members of the Wessex League and managed an 8th-place finish in their first season in 1986–1987. Eastleigh didn't manage a top seven finish until the 1995–96 season when a 4th-place finish was achieved, the first of six consecutive top-seven finishes. Paul Doswell joined the club in 2002 as manager and oversaw three successive promotions.

Rise up the leagues (2002–2005)
In 2002–03 they won the Wessex League and were promoted to Division One East of the Southern League. After finishing fourth in their first season, the club were promoted due to the formation of the Conference North and South taking clubs from the division above, and were transferred into the Premier Division of the Isthmian League.

The club finished third in its first season in the Premier Division, qualifying for the promotion play-offs. After beating Braintree Town 2–0 in the semi-final, they were promoted to the Conference South after a 2–1 victory over Leyton in the final. The club also won the Russell Cotes cup, beating Gosport Borough 3–1 in the final.

Conference South (2005–2014)
Eastleigh's first game in the Conference South was a 1–0 defeat to Hayes. Eastleigh finished their first season in the Conference South in a creditable eighth place. They narrowly missed out on a play-off place in the 2007–08 season coming sixth after a final day defeat at Thurrock (4–1). In 2008–09, they finished third, but lost to Hayes & Yeading United in the play-off semi-finals despite holding a 4–0 advantage at one stage during the first leg. In the 2009–10 season, Eastleigh reached the first round of the FA Cup for the first time narrowly losing to Barrow (2–1).

The ownership of the club changed in late 2011. On 26 November 2011, following a meeting of the board, it was announced that an offer from Bridle Insurance Limited for the majority shareholding of the club had been recommended for acceptance by the current shareholders. Bridle Insurance were then the primary sponsors of Oxford United. Chief executive Stewart Donald and chief operations officer Neil Fox would both come on to the Eastleigh board as directors, with Paul Murray remaining as chairman.

The takeover by Bridle Insurance was eventually confirmed when the club announced the company had acquired the club's shares on 1 February 2012. On 23 March 2012, chairman Paul Murray stood down from his post. Murray had formally stood down as chairman when the club was sold to Bridle Insurance, but had remained at the club in a non-executive chairman role. Mick Geddes was later appointed as his successor.

On 16 May 2012, Eastleigh won their first silverware for seven years, beating Totton 2–0 in the final of the Hampshire Senior Cup.

On Tuesday 11 September 2012, following three successive league defeats, the last 4–0 away to newly promoted side Billericay Town, the club announced, following a meeting between manager Ian Baird and Stewart Donald, that it had been agreed that Ian Baird would leave the club with immediate effect. Baird's replacement was announced the following day as ex-Stevenage Borough manager Richard Hill. Hill has also had spells assisting John Gregory at both Wycombe Wanderers and QPR, and Brian Little at Aston Villa. He has also been employed as assistant manager at Gillingham, Tranmere Rovers and Northampton Town.

Eastleigh came close to achieving promotion to the Conference Premier for the first time during the 2012–13 season, by making the Conference South play-offs through finishing 4th in the league. After initially losing the first leg of the semi-final against Dover Athletic at home 3–1, Eastleigh overturned this with a 2–0 away win in the second leg, so the match went to penalties, with Eastleigh losing 4–2. Eastleigh won the Conference South in 2013–14, sealing the title in front of a crowd of over 1,500 on 18 April 2014 when they beat Basingstoke Town 2–1 and achieved promotion to the Conference Premier for the first time in the club's history for the 2014–15 season.

Conference Premier / National League (2014–)
Eastleigh's first game in the Conference Premier was a 3–0 victory at Nuneaton Town. Their second game was their first ever live televised game on BT Sport; Eastleigh beat Aldershot Town 1–0 with an injury-time winning goal. The 2014–15 season also saw Eastleigh's second appearance in the FA Cup 1st round proper, where they reached the second round for the first time, beating Lincoln City in the first round with a last-minute goal. Eastleigh lost 2–1 at Southport in their first ever FA Cup second-round fixture. Eastleigh spent their entire first season in the top half of the league and enjoyed an unbeaten run at home until into the new year. As home form dipped their away form soared, the club picking up victories at Braintree, Chester and most notably Bristol Rovers, whom they beat 2–1. Eastleigh featured again on television with a convincing 4–0 home win over Macclesfield. Eastleigh eventually secured a 4th-place finish after five consecutive wins culminating in a 2–1 win at home to Kidderminster in front of a record crowd of 4,024. The playoffs proved a bridge too far for Eastleigh, who were beaten 2–1 at the Silverlake Stadium and 3–0 at Blundell Park by Grimsby Town to lose 5–1 on aggregate.

After a run of just one point from five games, on 23 September 2015, Richard Hill resigned as Eastleigh manager. Chris Todd was quickly appointed caretaker manager, and after three victories from four matches he was confirmed as the new manager on 15 October 2015. Eastleigh had a fine run of form under Todd and rose to third place in the league table by Christmas. Meanwhile, the club was gaining national coverage for its FA Cup exploits. Eastleigh travelled to Crewe in the 1st round and achieved their first ever giant killing, courtesy of a 1–0 win with a Ben Strevens penalty. In the second round, Eastleigh won 2–0 at minnows Stourbridge to record their first ever appearance in the Third round. On 9 January, Eastleigh drew 1–1 with Bolton. The game took place after much speculation it would be postponed, and sold out giving Eastleigh a new record attendance of 5,025. Ten days later Eastleigh travelled to Bolton and lost 3–2, having led 1–0 through a Joe Partington strike. As Eastleigh exited the FA Cup, league form dipped and they eventually finished seventh, missing out on a play-off place.

After just four games of the 2016–17 season, with Eastleigh languishing in 16th place, Chris Todd was relieved of his duties as Eastleigh manager. Ronnie Moore was appointed and enjoyed an unbeaten run to start his time at Eastleigh. On 4 October, Eastleigh beat Maidstone 3–0 to move up to 5th in the league after offering free admission for all, which attracted a crowd of 4,114. However Eastleigh's form dipped and Ronnie Moore left the club on 30 November with personal circumstances cited. Eastleigh promptly appointed Martin Allen, who had won the league with Barnet in 2015. Unfortunately, Allen had little success with Eastleigh and was sacked on 22 February after just two wins from fourteen games.

Whilst Eastleigh struggled in the league they again enjoyed success in the FA Cup. A first round home tie with Swindon Town was selected by the BBC for live coverage, and Eastleigh drew 1–1. Eastleigh won the reply 3–1 at the County Ground.  Eastleigh again required a replay to beat FC Halifax Town in the second round triumphing 2–0 at the Shay having drawn 3–3 at the Silverlake. In the third round Eastleigh travelled to Brentford, followed by a record ever away following of nearly 1,500 fans. Eastleigh were 5–1 down at half-time and lost the game 5–1.

Richard Hill was brought in as director of football and in April 2017 was announced as the new Eastleigh manager for the 2017–18 season with Andy Hessenthaler as his assistant. Eastleigh had a poor start to the season and, on 18 December, Hessenthaler was appointed manager with Hill reverting to director of football. Eastleigh finished the season 14th, missing out on a top half placing for the second year in a row.

The summer of 2018 brought change off the field as Chairman Stewart Donald left for League One side Sunderland. His share of Eastleigh F.C. was transferred to Mark Jewell, the new chairman, and 3 other directors, Kenny Amor, Tom Coffey and Joanne Sprigg.

In October 2018, following 4 victories manager Andy Hessenthaler left to join Dover Athletic. Ben Strevens was appointed as the new manager. Some good form in early 2019 contributed to Eastleigh finishing the season 7th and in the playoffs. Eastleigh faced a tie at Wrexham and won 1–0 in extra time through a superb Danny Hollands strike. In the semi-final, Eastleigh travelled to Salford. The game finished 1–1 after 120 minutes. Eastleigh led early in the penalty shoot out but eventually lost 4–3 after Chris Zebroski missed the decisive penalty.

The 2019–20 season was shortened by 9 games due to the COVID-19 pandemic. Eastleigh spent most of the season in the middle of the table, eventually finishing 16th. However, in the FA Cup, Eastleigh again reached the Second Round, having beaten Welling in the Fourth Qualifying Round (0-0, 4-2r) and Stourbridge in the First Round (2-2, 3-0r). Eastleigh faced Crewe Alexandra in a televised game at the Silverlake, drawing 1–1 with their League Two opponents thanks to a late equaliser from Southampton loanee Marcus Barnes. The Spifires lost the replay at Crewe 3–1.

Stadium
Eastleigh moved to Ten Acres in 1957 from their previous ground, Walnut Avenue. The club's record attendance is 5,025 for an FA Cup third round match against Bolton Wanderers on 9 January 2016.

In 1976 floodlights were added to Ten Acres.

In 2004, following promotion to the Isthmian League Premier Division, the old wooden stand was knocked down, and a new 352-seat grandstand was built on the half-way line stretching for just under a third of the pitch. Behind the motorway end hard standing was hard pitchside standing with a cover: this was named the Silverlake Stand. In 2006, the roof was widened across the Silverlake Stand to cover the whole width of the pitch.

Until 2006, the area opposite the grandstand was just hard standing backing into tall fir trees. During the summer of 2006, a metal back and roof were added, along with an electronic scoreboard on the roof of the Premier Telecom stand.

In 2009, 150 seats were added to the middle of the Silverlake Stand to give Eastleigh the necessary ground grading to compete in the Conference South play-offs.

The ground was, again, extensively redeveloped during 2014. New pitch-side fencing was installed following damage to the previous fencing during Eastleigh's championship winning game against Basingstoke. The former East Stand at Sandy Park (home of Exeter Chiefs RFC) was rebuilt along the Premier Telecom side of the ground as well as behind the clubhouse goal, providing a covered terraced accommodation for 2,000 spectators.  On 2 December 2014, the newly completed 2,290-seater South Stand was opened for the first time in a Conference Premier game against Dartford, with the club allowing spectators in for free to celebrate the occasion.

In early 2018, the 352-seat grandstand was extended to bring its capacity to 900 seats. This brought the stadium's capacity to 5,500.

Club colours, nickname and mascot
Eastleigh's colours are blue and white. They play in predominantly blue shirts with a white trim. They have white shorts and blue socks.

The club were without an official nickname until 2005 when a competition was run amongst the fans and "Spitfires" was chosen by supporter Mike Wimbridge. The Spitfire aeroplane was built in Southampton and first flown from Eastleigh Aerodrome, now Southampton Airport.

After the club gained its official nickname the club had an irregular mascot, Sammy the Spitfire, who was a dog. However, in 2015 a new mascot was selected, Brooksy the Bear, in honour of Mr Derik Brooks, who founded the club in 1946.

Rivalries
In Eastleigh's earlier Wessex League days they had rivalries with Sholing Sports, Hamble as well as a continued rivalry with A.F.C. Totton, who beat them 2–1 in the Wessex League cup final in the 2002–2003 season. As Eastleigh rose through the leagues their main rivals became Salisbury City whom they enjoyed a 4–0 victory over in the 2003–04 season. They have also had a rivalry with Havant & Waterlooville in recent years, largely sparked by the appointment of Ian Baird as Eastleigh manager in 2007.

As Eastleigh joined the Conference it lost any league games to teams within a radius of 40 miles, but regularly contested the Hampshire Derby with Aldershot Town and with Havant & Waterlooville.

Players

First team squad

Out on loan

Notable former players
Among the players who have played for Eastleigh and went on to play in The Football League are:
 Will Aimson
Tyrone Mings
 Mark Marshall
 Aaron Martin
 Damian Scannell
 Brett Williams
 Anton Robinson
 Harry Pell
 Jamie Turley
 Josh Payne
 Joe Partington
 Luke Coulson
 Mikael Mandron
 Bondz N'Gala
 Ryan Bird
 Mekhi Leacock-McLeod
 David Pipe
 Ben Close
 Tyler Garratt
 Hakeem Odoffin
 Callum Howe
 Samuel Matthews
 Joey Jones
 Rob Atkinson
 Maksymilian Stryjek
 Jack Payne
 Joe Tomlinson

 Marcus Barnes
 Ben House

Non-playing staff
According to Club website
Chairman Tom Coffey
Chief Executive Tom Coffey
Operations Director Tom Coffey
Finance Director Joanne Sprigg
Directors Mick Geddes, Peter Vickery, Mick Budny, Alan Harding, Allen Prebble
Life President Derik Brooks
Manager Lee Bradbury
Assistant manager Jason Bristow, Brian Stock
Goalkeeping coach Ross Flitney
First Team Performance Analysts Matt Musgrove, Neeraj Parmar
First Team Performance Analysis Intern Kai Toogood
Head of Academy Luke Hardy
Club doctor Dr Greg Warner & Dr Luke Summat

Notable managers

(Up to and including match vs Solihull Moors on 29 May 2021)(Above stats include matches in the League, Play-Offs and all rounds in the FA Cup, FA Trophy, Hampshire Senior Cup and Conference League Cup)

League and cup history
Earlier records can be found at Football Club History Database – Eastleigh

Last Updated: 15:41, 4 August 2022

a: Moved to Isthmian Premier League after Non-League System restructuring

PR = Preliminary Round; Q = Qualifying Round; R = Round Proper; P = Position; Pld = Matches played; W = Matches won; D = Matches drawn; L = Matches lost; GF = Goals for; GA = Goals against; GD = Goal difference; Pts = Points

Club records
Best FA Cup performance: Third round, 2015–16, 2016–17
Best FA Trophy performance: Quarter-finals, 2013–14
Best FA Vase performance: Fourth round, 1982–83, 1990–91, 1994–95
Record attendance: 5,025 vs Bolton Wanderers, FA Cup third round, 9 January 2016
Biggest victory: 12–1 vs Hythe & Dibden, 11 December 1948
Heaviest defeat: 0–11 vs Austin Sports, 1 January 1947
Most appearances: Ian Knight, 611
Most goals: Johnnie Williams, 177

Most appearances

Competitive matches only. After 29 May 2021 match v Solihull Moors

Player of the Season award winners

Honours

League 
Conference South (Tier 6)
Champions (1): 2013–14
Wessex League Premier
Champions (1): 2002–03
Hampshire League
Division Two champions: 1967–70
Division Three champions: 1950–51, 1953–54
Southampton Senior League (West)
Champions (1): 1949–50

Cups 
Russell Cotes Cup
Winners: 2005
Runner-up: 2006
Hampshire Intermediate Cup
Winners: 1951
Hampshire Midweek Floodlit Cup
Winners: 1979
Hampshire Senior Cup
Winners: 2012
Wessex League Cup
Runners-up: 2002–03

References

External links

Official Blog
Official Facebook page
Official Twitter page
Match Commentary
Match Pictures

 
Football clubs in Hampshire
National League (English football) clubs
Association football clubs established in 1946
Eastleigh
Southern Football League clubs
Isthmian League
Football clubs in England
1946 establishments in England